Mao Zuquan (1883–1952) was a Chinese politician of the Republic of China (1912–49), before the Republic of China government relocated to the island of Taiwan in 1949.

Early life
Mao was born during the late Qing dynasty in 1883, in the Chinese county of Haimen in Jiangsu near Shanghai.  Born to a wealthy land-owning family, he was a well-educated scholar who studied in neighboring Japan as a student during his youth.  Shortly after returning to China, he entered politics and quickly gained prominence in Chinese politics.

Political career
The early 1900s was a tumultuous period in Chinese history.  The 1911 Xinhai Revolution ended China's last imperial dynasty, the Manchu-led Qing dynasty, and resulted in the establishment of the Republic of China on January 1, 1912. The revolution marked the end of 2,000 years of imperial rule and the beginning of China's early republican era.  In Nanjing, revolutionary armies established a provisional coalition government.  During this time, Mao became one of the founding members of the Kuomintang Party of China.

In 1912, Mao was appointed as a member of the Kuomintang National Assembly, which consisted of several major parliamentary bodies that existed in the Republic of China during the early 1900s.  He quickly climbed through the ranks and became a prominent individual in the government as well as in Chinese society.  In 1924, he was chosen by the Kuomintang Central Committee as a candidate for the position of an Executive Committee Member of the Kuomintang.

In his later years, Mao served a number of political positions in the Nationalist Chinese government.  He was appointed as the head of the Jiangsu Civil Administration on Mainland China and also served as the Secretary of the Official Punishment Committee as well as the Secretary-General to the President of the Republic of China.  Mao also served as the Presidential National Policy Consultant as well as Republic of China's first Minister of the Ministry of Justice (Republic of China).

Death
The Chinese Civil War between Chiang Kai-shek’s Kuomintang forces and Mao Zedong's Chinese Communist Party (CCP) entered its final stage in 1945, following the surrender of Japan.

However, it was clear towards the end of the war that the Communists were to gain control of mainland China.  The majority of Mao Zhuquan's family members were able to evacuate to the island of Taiwan during the end of the Civil War during what is now known as "The Great Retreat", an exodus of the remnants of the Kuomintang-ruled government of the Republic of China to the island of Taiwan (Formosa) in December of 1949.  The Kuomintang party members and family of party members, its officers and approximately 2 million troops took part in the retreat, fleeing the advance of the Communist People's Liberation Army.

Mao stayed behind on the mainland, hoping that the political tides would turn, rather than to relocate with Chiang Kai-shek and his troops to the island with the rest of his family.  However, in 1950, he was arrested by the Communist Party of China while in Shanghai and was subsequently imprisoned for refusing to cooperate with the new government.  He was imprisoned for two years until 1952, when he was found dead at the age of 64, in his jail cell as a result of a hunger strike in opposition to the Chinese Communist Party and the leaders of 1950s China .  He was subsequently buried in an unmarked mass grave in Shanghai, China.

Legacy
Many documents and records of the Kuomintang era and Imperial China were destroyed during the Cultural Revolution from 1966 to 1976.  However, those that are remaining, including various archives of Mao's writings, his political work, as well as his photos can be found in the Presidential Palace located in Nanjing, Jiangsu, China, which housed the Office of the President of the Republic of China since 1927 until the capital was relocated to Taipei in 1949.  The palace now houses a museum called the China Modern History Museum where Mao's work can be found.  

His living descendants now reside in Taiwan, China, as well as the United States.

References

1883 births
1952 deaths
Republic of China politicians from Jiangsu
Deaths by starvation
Politicians from Nantong
People from Haimen